Sunamganj is a town in the Sylhet Division of northeastern Bangladesh. It is the administrative headquarters and largest town of Sunamganj District.

Municipality
The municipality was formed in 1960.

Nader Bakht was elected to a second consecutive term as mayor of Sunamganj in January 2021, as an Awami League candidate. Days later, a warrant was issued for his arrest on allegations that in 2019 he supplied fake birth certificates to Rohingya refugees in Bangladesh. He obtained bail on 21 January.

References

Populated places in Sunamganj District